Sweet Sixteen is the second studio album by Filipino singer Sarah Geronimo, released on November 16, 2004 under VIVA Records. To date, the album has reached triple platinum status by the PARI, selling more than 120,000+ copies in the Philippines.

Singles
The album's carrier single is "How Could You Say You Love Me", written by Vehnee Saturno and Doris Saturno, who were also responsible for Geronimo's debut single "Forever's Not Enough". After a week of its release it was certified gold and after a month, it was certified Platinum by the Philippine Association of the Record Industry, selling 30,000 copies. The second single was a dance hit written by novelty composer Lito Camo, entitled "Lumingon Ka Lang". The third single is a cover version—Foreigner's "I Want to Know What Love Is", which became a big hit. The last single released from the album was "Love Can't Lie", written by Agatha Obar.

Among other covers that she did for the album were "Love of My Life" which was originally done by Queen, "Before I Let You Go" which became a hit by labelmates Freestyle, "You Don't Know Me" which was originally recorded Ray Charles, and the operatic "Light of a Million Mornings".

Commercial performance
In the Philippines, Sweet Sixteen debuted straight to number one on the Philippine Top Albums chart, it sold 15,000 copies on that week being certified PARI Gold. Then on its second week it disappeared on the chart, on its third week it climbed back on the chart at number four. The album spent only five weeks on the chart.

Track listing
 "How Could You Say You Love Me" (Vehnee Saturno, Doris Saturno) – 4:05
 "Lumingon Ka Lang" (Lito Camo) – 3:43
 "I Want to Know What Love Is" (Michael Leslie Jones) – 5:02
 "Minsan" (Edwin Marollano) – 4:02
 "Champion" (Yman Panaligan) – 3:26
 "Love of My Life" (Freddie Mercury) – 3:52
 "And You Smiled at Me" (Reuben Laurente) – 3:22
 "Hanggang Kailan" (Ogie Alcasid) – 4:15
 "Prinsesa ng Puso Mo" (Marollano) – 3:52
 "Before I Let You Go" (featuring 17:28) (Top Suzara) – 4:24
 "Love Can't Lie" (Agatha) – 4:47
 "You're Taking My Breath Away" (Anne Marie Bush) – 3:50
 "You Don't Know Me" (Arnold Eddy, Cindy Walker) – 3:19
 "Sana" (V. Saturno, Popsie Saturno) – 3:41
 "Kay Gandang Umaga" (Fragil) (with Mark Bautista) (Agatha, Luigi Lopez, Adrian Posse) – 3:46
 "Light of a Million Mornings" (Cloringen, Mark Gersmehl, Hayes) – 4:43
 "Tunay Talaga" (Charmee) – 2:46 (bonus track)
 "Bulletin Song" – 2:27 (bonus track)

Personnel
Credits were taken from Allmusic.

 17:28 – lead vocals (track 10)
 Mark Bautista – lead vocals (track 15)
 Rico Bicol – digital mastering
 Arnold Buena – arranger
 Lito Camo – producer
 Vincent Del Rosario – executive producer
 Christian De Walden – arranger, producer
 Luis Espiritu – stylist
 Sarah Geronimo – lead vocals
 Reuben Laurente – background vocals
 Rudy Lozano – guitar
 Sylvia Macaraeg – background vocals
 Edwin Marollano – background vocals, producer
 Noel Mendez – guitar
 Moy Ortiz – background vocals, vocal arrangement, producer
 Eric Payumo – mastering and mixing
 Romer Rosellon – mixing
 Efren San Pedro – mixing
 Vehnee Saturno – digital mastering, producer
 Eugene Villaluz – vocal supervision, supervising producer, producer

Certifications

Release history

References

2004 albums
Sarah Geronimo albums
Viva Records (Philippines) albums